Jane Freeman may refer to:

Jane Freeman (actress) (1935–2017), English-born Welsh actress
Jane Freeman (artist) (1871–1963), English-born American portrait painter

See also
Jane Friedman, CEO